The women's 104.4 kilometers individual road race competition at the 2018 Asian Games was held on 22 August 2018 in Subang.

Schedule
All times are Western Indonesia Time (UTC+07:00)

Results 
Legend
DNF — Did not finish

References
Results

External links
 Official website

Women's road race